In the Hindu calendar, Chaturdashi is the 14th day (Tithi) of the waxing phase or waning phase of the moon. This is the day prior to new moon (Amavasya) or full moon (Pournami). It has a great significance to Bengalis, as goddess Tara appeared to rishi vasistha on this tithi.

Etymology 
Chaturdasi means 14, wherein Chatur means four and Dasi means 10. It is taken from the Sanskrit.

Festivals 
 The day before Diwali is Naraka Chaturdashi. It is before the Amavasya in the month of Asvina.
 Maha Shivaratri or Maagha Bahula Chaturdashi. It is before the Amavasya in the month of Maagha.
 Anant Chaturdashi is performed in the bright fortnight, Shukla Paksha of Bhadrapad.
 Vaikuntha Chaturdashi, shukla paksha chaturdashi of Kartik  the month (November–December).
 Tara puja is performed on Aswin chaturdashi, before laxmi puja.
 Chachor of Narapora or Holika Dahan is celebrated in Vasant Chaturdashi before Holi.

References

Hindu calendar
14